He Yanwen (Chinese: 何 燕雯, born 29 September 1966) is a female Chinese rower. She competed at 1988 Seoul Olympic Games. Together with her teammates, she won a bronze medal in women's coxed eight.

References

Chinese female rowers
1966 births
Rowers at the 1988 Summer Olympics
Rowers at the 1992 Summer Olympics
Olympic rowers of China
Olympic bronze medalists for China
Living people
Olympic medalists in rowing
Asian Games medalists in rowing
Rowers at the 1990 Asian Games
Medalists at the 1988 Summer Olympics
Asian Games gold medalists for China
Medalists at the 1990 Asian Games
20th-century Chinese women
21st-century Chinese women